Inversion table may refer to:
 An object used in inversion therapy
 A list of numbers encoding a permutation